Delocrinus is a genus of extinct crinoids, belonging to the family Catacrinidae. Specimens have been found in Kansas Missouri Nebraska Nevada Oklahoma, Arizona, Iowa, Texas, Utah and Virginia.

Delocrinus missouriensis was made the state fossil of Missouri in 1989.

Description
Like extant crinoids, Delocrinus species was anchored to a hard surface by a holdfast out of which grew an articulated stalk. On top of this was a calyx with a number of feather-like arms. Each arm bore short branches known as pinnules and from these cirri were extended which sifted plankton from the water flowing past.

References

Paleozoic echinoderms of North America
Crinoid genera
Permian crinoids
Carboniferous crinoids
Symbols of Missouri